Richard Henry Malden, BD,  (19 October 1879 – August 1951), Dean of Wells, was a prominent Anglican churchman, editor, classical and Biblical scholar, and a writer of ghost stories.

Career

Educated at Eton College and King's College, Cambridge, Malden was ordained deacon in 1904 and priest in 1905 by the Bishop of Manchester. He subsequently served as Assistant Curate at St Peter's, Swinton, Salford, 1904–07; Lecturer at Selwyn College, Cambridge, 1907–10; Principal of Leeds Clergy School, and Lecturer of Leeds Parish Church, 1910–19.  During the First World War he served as Acting Chaplain of HMS Valiant, January 1916–December 1917 and an Acting Chaplain, R N, 1916–18. His next appointment was as Vicar of St Michael and All Angels Church, Headingley, Leeds, 1918–33, later becoming Honorary Canon of Ripon, 1926–33, and Dean of Wells, 1933–50.

He was also Examining Chaplain to the Bishop of Norwich from 1910; Proctor in Convocation, 1924–33; Chaplain to the King, 1926–1933 and President of the Somerset Archaeological Society, 1943–44.

He served additionally as general editor of Crockford's Clerical Directory between 1920 and 1944. His main task in this respect was to write many of the anonymous prefaces for which the directory was becoming celebrated, offering an overview of recent events in the church. His other ecclesiastical commitments would have allowed little time for participating in the more routine aspects of producing the directory. Between 1942 and 1947 he also edited his local diocesan magazine, the Bath & Wells Diocesan Gazette.

His book of stories Nine Ghosts (1942) was compiled over many years and issued as a tribute to his long friendship with the writer M R James, who had been one of the most celebrated authors in this particular genre.

Personal details

Malden was the son of Charles Edward Malden, Recorder of Thetford, and Sarah Fanny Malden, daughter of Sir Richard Mayne.  He was married at Holy Trinity Church Marylebone, on 24 January 1918 to Etheldred Theodora Macnaughten, daughter of Canon H A Macnaughten of Tankersley, Yorkshire.

His politics were reportedly "High Tory with a hint of Erastianism".  In his latter years he became a familiar figure in Wells and elsewhere, typically wearing a frock coat and top hat.

Bibliography

His main publications included:

 Foreign Missions, 1910;
 The Temptation of the Son of Man, 1913
 Watchman, What of the Night?, 1918
 The Old Testament, 1919
 Problems of the New Testament To-day, 1923
 The Church of Headingley in Four Centuries, 1923
 Religion and the New Testament, 1928
 This Church and Realm, 1931
 The Roman Catholic Church and the Church of England, 1933
 The Story of Wells Cathedral, 1934
 The Inspiration of the Bible, 1935
 The Apocrypha, 1936
 The Promise of the Father, 1937
 The Authority of the New Testament, 1937
 Christian Belief, 1942
 Nine Ghosts, 1942
 The Growth of a Cathedral Church, 1944
 Abbeys, their Rise and Fall, 1944 
 The Hangings In The Quire Of Wells Cathedral, 1948

References

External links 
  R.H. Malden (1879-1951) by Roger Johnson, from Ghosts & Scholars No 9,  "Writers in the James Tradition, Number 6", retrieved 20 May 2012.

1879 births
1951 deaths
Ghost story writers
Deans of Wells
English Anglican theologians
People educated at Eton College
Alumni of King's College, Cambridge